Scott James (born 6 July 1994) is an Australian snowboarder and four-time Olympian. He was the flag bearer for Australia at the 2018 Winter Olympics, where he won a bronze medal in the halfpipe. Scotty grew up in Warrandyte, Victoria and is a keen golfer and skateboarder.

Personal life
James dated American model, Ivy Miller, from 2016 to 2018. In 2019, James began dating Canadian heiress and singer, Chloe Stroll. Stroll’s brother, F1 driver Lance Stroll, introduced the two, stating to Chloe Stroll at the time, “I think I just found the guy you’re going to marry.” In 2021, James and Stroll became engaged. The couple currently reside together in Monaco, giving James quick access to halfpipe training grounds in Saas-Fee, Switzerland and the French Alps.

James is good friends with fellow Aussie, F1 driver Daniel Ricciardo.

James has a condition that causes his knee to randomly dislocate.

Career
James's first snowboard was not actually made for snowboarding—it was a display board in a shop in Vancouver. James and his father had trouble finding a board small enough for him, so they bought the display board for $10. He began competing at age six and, after beating the older kids, he started travelling for competitions at 10 years old. At the time, Europe and America were the main locations for snowboarding training and competitions. His mother accompanied him on the road, homeschooling him and providing tutors when needed. James has stated, "There’s been a lot of sacrifice from my parents to get me here — and I’m very grateful." Due to his success at a young age, James began to be viewed by media and peers as a snowboarding prodigy.

He moved from racing into halfpipe and slopestyle, making his international debut as a 14-year-old at the 2008 Europa Cup in Saas Fee, Switzerland. When Australian Nathan Johnstone was ruled out of the 2010 Winter Olympics with an ankle injury, James went to the World Cup event in Stoneham, Canada, to try to achieve the top-19 result that would make him eligible to replace Johnstone at the Olympics. He pulled off his best result to date, a 15th-place finish, which secured him a spot in the 2010 Winter Olympics in Vancouver. At the age of 15, James was Australia's youngest male Olympian in 50 years and the youngest male competitor at the Vancouver Games. While training for the halfpipe event in Vancouver, James caught his heel-edge and slapped against the wall, fracturing his right wrist. Despite the injury, James pushed through the pain and competed in the event, finishing 21st.

From early 2011 to 2012, all of James' World Cup results in Halfpipe, Slopestyle and Big Air climbed into the top ten territory at a time when he was growing taller.

Competing at the last event of the 2013/14 season before the Sochi Games, James won his first World Cup event medal, a bronze in the halfpipe. He also finished in the top 10 at two other World Cup events that season. His results and points earned him the World Cup Title in Halfpipe for the first time in his career and made James the #1 ranked halfpipe rider in the world at just 19 years old.

James won the bronze medal in the men's halfpipe competition at the 2018 Winter Olympics in PyeongChang, behind Shaun White of the United States gold medal in the event and Ayumu Hirano of Japan's silver. He won a silver in the men's halfpipe competition in Beijing 2022 Winter Olympics.

In December 2022, James earned a near-perfect score of 99.00 on his second run in the men's final of the U.S. Snowboarding Grand Prix. It was the second-highest score in the history of International Ski and Snowboard Federation events. The highest, a 100.00, was awarded to Shaun White at the 2018 Aspen Snowmass halfpipe event. The 99.00 score was the highest ever earned by James in a halfpipe event. His run started with a switch McTwist Japan with massive amplitude that caused audible gasps from the crowd, into a cab 1440 stalefish, frontside 1080 tail grab, cab 900 indy, and ending with a switch backside double cork 1260 indy.

Cryptocurrency
In October 2022, OKX, a cryptocurrency exchange, announced that James would be an influencer for OKX.

Awards
In 2018, James became the first snowboarder to win the VIS Award of Excellence. The Victorian Institute of Sport's Award of Excellence honours the athlete who has achieved outstanding sporting results at major events during the year while contributing to the promotion and development of their sport and/or made a significant contribution to society beyond pure sporting performance. James earned the award for being an active role model and mentor within his sport, as well as a great ambassador for winter sports and the sporting community. He played an active leadership role within the newly structured National Park & Pipe Program, which targeted young athletes with the potential to be medal contenders at the Beijing 2022 Olympic Winter Games. James worked closely with the Olympic Winter Institute of Australia and Mt Buller to secure the best possible national training facility for Halfpipe in Victoria, Australia, and he spent considerable time and effort to assist with the project.

References

External links

Living people
1994 births
Olympic snowboarders of Australia
Australian male snowboarders
Snowboarders at the 2010 Winter Olympics
Snowboarders at the 2014 Winter Olympics
Snowboarders at the 2018 Winter Olympics
Snowboarders at the 2022 Winter Olympics
X Games athletes
Medalists at the 2018 Winter Olympics
Medalists at the 2022 Winter Olympics
Olympic silver medalists for Australia
Olympic bronze medalists for Australia
Olympic medalists in snowboarding
Sportspeople from Melbourne
People from Warrandyte, Victoria
Sportsmen from Victoria (Australia)